Leo Dalis Santana Heredia is a Dominican Republic Greco-Roman wrestler. He won one of the bronze medals in the 130 kg event at the 2019 Pan American Games held in Lima, Peru. He also won the gold medal in his event at the 2021 Pan American Wrestling Championships held in Guatemala City, Guatemala.

Career 

In 2018, he won the silver medal in the 130 kg event at the Central American and Caribbean Games held in Barranquilla, Colombia.

At the 2020 Pan American Wrestling Championships held in Ottawa, Canada, he won one of the bronze medals in the 130 kg event. He also competed in the 2020 Pan American Wrestling Olympic Qualification Tournament, also held in Ottawa, Canada, without qualifying for the 2020 Summer Olympics in Tokyo, Japan. In May 2021, he also failed to qualify for the Olympics at the World Olympic Qualification Tournament held in Sofia, Bulgaria.

He won one of the bronze medals in his event at the 2022 Pan American Wrestling Championships held in Acapulco, Mexico.

Major results

References

External links 
 

Living people
Year of birth missing (living people)
Place of birth missing (living people)
Dominican Republic male sport wrestlers
Pan American Games medalists in wrestling
Pan American Games bronze medalists for the Dominican Republic
Medalists at the 2019 Pan American Games
Wrestlers at the 2019 Pan American Games
Central American and Caribbean Games silver medalists for the Dominican Republic
Competitors at the 2018 Central American and Caribbean Games
Central American and Caribbean Games medalists in wrestling
Pan American Wrestling Championships medalists
21st-century Dominican Republic people